Studio manager, studio director, or studio head is a job title in various media-related professions, including design, advertising, and broadcasting.

Design and advertising
A design or advertising studio manager's responsibilities will typically include traffic management, by ensuring all briefs are dispatched in the studio according to a designer's skills and strengths and ensure all work is delivered promptly and to deadline to the relevant people. A design studio manager should have excellent organizational and communication skills and motivate their team by showing good leadership. The Manager should have a great understanding of how to both achieve and develop project briefs to achieve clients needs and successful design.

The following are a  studio manager's responsibilities:

 Workload dispatch
 Compiling studio schedules for senior management meetings
 Compiling Road map for projects
 Constant update of Studio schedules
 Project quality control and assessment
 Project review and analysis
 Developing project Briefs
 Consolidating client needs
 Prompt timesheet collection
 Understanding of how deadlines work

Television and radio
In a broadcasting context, a studio manager, or SM, fulfills an operational role in radio broadcasting to enable and ensure programmes are produced to a high technical standard.

Principally, SMs are involved in the operation of studio equipment. This generally encompasses a mixing desk, alongside ancillary equipment such as ISDN codecs, playback and recording devices, and telephone and VoIP adapters.

The precise nature of a studio manager's work will depend upon the nature of their deployment, but the core function is usually to ensure the programme is correctly 'balanced'. For speech programmes, this generally means each contributor should heard with the same perceived loudness. A desirable music balance reflects the sound of a performance; for an orchestral rendition, each instrument ought to be heard at the correct relative volume and, for stereo programmes, at the 'correct' position in the orchestra.

Within the BBC, studio managers are used extensively across news, drama, and live music output.

A studio manager might also be known as a desk driver, technical operator, TechOp, or facilitator, particularly outside of the BBC. For a period around 1970 the BBC used the term Programme Operations Assistant, or POA.

External links 
 Old Studio Managers This site has now reopened.
 Personal recollections of a BBC studio manager.

References

Advertising occupations
Broadcasting occupations